Gool Arnas Assembly constituency is one of the 87 constituencies in the Jammu and Kashmir Legislative Assembly of Jammu and Kashmir a north state of India. Gool Arnas is also part of Udhampur Lok Sabha constituency. Gool Arnas was not a constituency until 1995 when it was created by way of delimitation. In fact the Arnas constituency was bifurcated into two parts- Gool Arnas and Gulabgarh.

Member of Legislative Assembly
 1996: Abdul Wahied Shan, National Conference
 2002: Ajaz Ahmed Khan, Independent
 2008: Ajaz Ahmed Khan, Indian National Congress

Election results

2014

See also
 Reasi district
 List of constituencies of Jammu and Kashmir Legislative Assembly

References

Assembly constituencies of Jammu and Kashmir
Reasi district
1995 establishments in Jammu and Kashmir
Constituencies established in 1995